Donald W. Merricks (born January 13, 1952) is an American politician. Since 2008 he has been a Republican member of the Virginia House of Delegates, representing the 16th district in Southside Virginia, made up of the city of Martinsville and parts of Henry and Pittsylvania Counties.

Merricks announced that he would not run for reelection in 2013.

Electoral history

Notes

External links

1952 births
Living people
Republican Party members of the Virginia House of Delegates
Averett University alumni
Politicians from Danville, Virginia
Baptists from Virginia
21st-century American politicians